Emotional selection refers to a form of evolutionary selection where decisions are made based primarily on emotional factors.

References 

Selection
Evolutionary biology
Ecological processes
Emotion